"What I Need To Do" is a song written by Tom Damphier and Bill Luther, and recorded by American country music artist Kenny Chesney. It was released in January 2000 as the fourth and final single from Chesney's 1999 album Everywhere We Go. The song peaked at number 8 in the United States and number 13 in Canada in 2000.

Content
The song describes the narrator thinking about "what [he] need[s] to do" as he is driving away from his old hometown away from his former lover. He also thinks that he should "turn [his] car around" and go back to his lover, then hold her, and then tell her how sorry he is for what he did.

Chart positions

Year-end charts

References

2000 singles
Kenny Chesney songs
Song recordings produced by Buddy Cannon
Song recordings produced by Norro Wilson
BNA Records singles
Songs written by Bill Luther (songwriter)
1999 songs